The Möljä Bridge is a concrete beam bridge over the Toppilansalmi strait in Oulu, Finland. The bridge connects districts of Toppila and Toppilansaari.

The bridge has two road lanes and raised sidewalks for pedestrians and bicycles. It was opened to traffic on 15 November 2012.

References

External links 

Bridges in Finland
Buildings and structures in Oulu
Transport in Oulu
Bridges completed in 2012